Psychoeducation (a portmanteau of psychological education) is an evidence-based therapeutic intervention for patients and their loved ones that provides information and support to better understand and cope with illness. Psychoeducation is most often associated with serious mental illness, including dementia, schizophrenia, clinical depression, anxiety disorders, psychotic illnesses, eating disorders, personality disorders and autism, although the term has also been used for programs that address physical illnesses, such as cancer.

Psychoeducation offered to patients and family members teaches problem-solving and communication skills and provides education and resources in an empathetic and supportive environment. Results from more than 30 studies indicate psychoeducation improves family well-being, lowers rates of relapse and improves recovery.

Overview
Family members of individuals with serious mental illness (SMI) are often involved in initiating, advocating for, and supporting their relative's mental health care. They may be thrust into the role of case manager, medication monitor, financial planner, or housing coordinator with little education or support to prepare them. Professionally delivered family psychoeducation is a potential resource for both individuals with SMI and their family members, designed to engage, educate, and support family members so that they can better assist the person with SMI in managing their illness. The importance of family involvement and the efficacy of family psychoeducation is recognized by best-practice guidelines for the treatment of individuals with serious mental health conditions.

History

The concept of psychoeducation was first noted in the medical literature, in an article by John E. Donley "Psychotherapy and re-education" in The Journal of Abnormal Psychology, published in 1911. It wasn't until 30 years later that the first use of the word psychoeducation appeared in the medical literature in title of the book The psychoeducational clinic by Brian E. Tomlinson. New York, NY, US: MacMillan Co. This book was published in 1941. In French, the first instance of the term psychoéducation is in the thesis "La stabilité du comportement" published in 1962.

The popularization and development of the term psychoeducation into its current form is widely attributed to the American researcher C.M. Anderson in 1980 in the context of the treatment of schizophrenia. Her research concentrated on educating relatives concerning the symptoms and the process of the schizophrenia. Also, her research focused on the stabilization of social authority and on the improvement in handling of the family members among themselves. Finally, C.M. Anderson's research included more effective stress management techniques. Psychoeducation in behavior therapy has its origin in the patient's relearning of emotional and social skills. In the last few years increasingly systematic group programs have been developed, in order to make the knowledge more understandable to patients and their families.

Single and group
Psychoeducation can take place in one-on-one discussion or in groups and by any qualified health educator as well as health professionals such as nurses, mental health counselors, social workers, occupational therapists, psychologists and physicians. In the groups several patients are informed about their illnesses at once. Also, exchanges of experience between the concerned patients and mutual support play a role in the healing process.

Brief psychoeducation 
Brief psychoeducation was developed as a way of reducing the use of the time of health care worker. Brief psychoeducation (less than 10-weeks) increases compliance with the healthcare systems suggested medication. It is unclear whether it decreases relapse though it may in the short term. There is no evidence that it reduces health care efficiency (thought studies may be underpowered). There is low-quality evidence that it may improve certain measures of social functioning such as social disability. There is low quality data that it reduces the change of death.

Possible risks and side effects

Often acutely sick patients have substantial thinking, concentration and attention disturbances, at the beginning of their illness and care should be taken not to overwhelm the patient with too much information. Besides positive effects of a therapeutic measure like psychoeducation, in principle, also other possible risks should be considered. The detailed knowledge of the condition, prognosis therapy possibilities and the disease process, can make the patient and/or family member stressed. Therefore, one should draw an exact picture of the risks regarding the psychological condition of the patient. It should be considered how much the patient already understands, and how much knowledge the patient can take up and process in their current condition. The ability to concentrate should be considered as well as the maximum level of emotional stress that the patient can take. In the context of a psychoeducational program a selection of aspects and/or therapy possibilities can be considered and discussed with the patient. Otherwise, the patient may form an incomplete picture of their illness, and they may form ideas about treatment alternatives from a vantage point of incomplete information. However, the professional should also make a complete representation of the possibilities of treatment, and attention should be paid to not make excessive demands of the patient, that is, giving too much information at once.

See also
 Family therapy
 Group psychotherapy
 National Alliance on Mental Illness

References

Bibliography 
 Bäuml, Josef, et al. Psychoeducation: A Basic Psychotherapeutic Intervention for Patients With Schizophrenia and Their Families. Schizophrenia Bulletin. 2006 32 (Supplement 1): S1-S9
 Hogarty, GE, Anderson, CM, Reiss, D, et al. Family psychoeducation, social skills training and maintenance chemotherapy in the aftercare treatment of schizophrenia: II. Two-year effects of a controlled study on relapse and adjustment. Arch Gen Psychiatry 1991; 48:340–347.
 Chan, W.-c. S., Kua, E., Tsoi, T., Xiao, C., & Tay, P. K. C. (2012). Dementia: How to care for your loved one and yourself. A caregiver's guide. Singapore: Nu-earth.

External links 
New York State Psychiatric Institute's Patient and Family Library- A Psychoeducation Project
New York City Voices: A Consumer-Run Psychoeducative Project
The Blog of Will Jiang, MLS the Former NYSPI & Columbia Psychiatry Library Chief

Social work
Psychotherapies